Adrian Chomiuk (born  in Biała Podlaska) is a Polish footballer who, plays for Eik-Tønsberg in Norway.

Club career
Chomiuk started his career in 2001 in the student sports club TOP 54 Biała Podlaska, where he trained until 2003. In 2006, Chomiuk took part in the Polish Senior Junior Championships, and Gwarek won the gold medal. In 2007, he moved to Polonia Bytom. On , he made his debut in Ekstraklasa in a 3–0 game of the 10th round with GKS Bełchatów, entering the playing field in the 82nd minute behind Jakub Dziółka. In the spring of the 2009/2010 season , Chomiuk returned to Polonia Bytom. On , he signed a contract with the Bytom club, valid until . On , at the player's request, his contract with Polonia Bytom was terminated. On , he signed a contract with the second-league team Bytovia Bytów. On , he became a first-league footballer with GKS Tychy by signing a one-year contract with this club, with an option to extend it for another year. On , the option to extend the contract for a further twelve months was exercised. On , it turned out that Chomiuk would not extend the expiring contract with the Tychy club. Two days later, he signed a one-year contract with Termalica. On 7 July, he tore his Achilles tendon; the day after, he underwent surgery. On May 30, together with Termalica, he secured a promotion to Ekstraklasa.

References

External links
 
 
 

1988 births
Association football defenders
Kolejarz Stróże players
Living people
Polish footballers
Polonia Bytom players